The province of Laguna has 681 barangays comprising its 24 towns and 6 city.

Barangays

References

 01
Laguna (province)